The Segreganset River is a small river in Bristol County, Massachusetts that flows  in a southeasterly direction through Taunton and Dighton into the Taunton River. Named tributaries include the Maple Swamp, Poppasquash Swamp, Sunken Brook and Cedar Swamp.

The USGS maintains a gaging station on the Segreganset River near Center Street in Dighton.

See also
Cole River
Taunton River Watershed
Three Mile River

References

Greater Taunton Area
Rivers of Bristol County, Massachusetts
Taunton River watershed
Taunton, Massachusetts
Rivers of Massachusetts